Robert Lindsay Thomas (born November 20, 1943) is an American politician and businessman.

Thomas was born in Patterson, Georgia and graduated from Patterson High School in 1961. He attended Gordon Military Academy in Barnesville for one year and graduated from the University of Georgia in Athens with a Bachelor of Arts degree in 1966. After college, Thomas served in the Georgia Air National Guard from 1966 until 1972 and was in the 165th Tactical Airlift Group. He also worked as an investment banker and a farmer at Grace Acres Farm, a family owned farm in Screven, Georgia.

The political career of Thomas consisted of five consecutive terms in the U.S. House of Representatives beginning with the 98th United States Congress and ending in 1992 when he chose not to seek reelection. He was a Democrat.

Following his congressional service, Thomas served as the director of state governmental affairs for the Atlanta Committee for the Olympic Games and president and chief executive officer of the Georgia Chamber of Commerce. In 2002, he was appointed Senior Vice President of Governmental Relations for AGL Resources in Atlanta. Thomas maintains residences in Atlanta and Screven, Georgia.

References

AGL Resources Bio for R. Lindsay Thomas

External links

1943 births
Living people
20th-century American businesspeople
American investment bankers
People from Pierce County, Georgia
Democratic Party members of the United States House of Representatives from Georgia (U.S. state)
Farmers from Georgia (U.S. state)
Georgia National Guard personnel
University of Georgia alumni
United States Air Force airmen